The capture of Saint Pierre and Miquelon was the successful takeover of the islands of Saint Pierre and Miquelon, an overseas collectivity of France off the coast of Newfoundland, on 24 December 1941 by Free French forces. At the time, the islands' authorities had sworn their allegiance to the Vichy French government.

Prelude
Following the armistice of 22 June 1940, the administration of the islands had been under the control of the Vichy government, represented by the administrator Gilbert de Bournat. The presence of Vichy-administered islands off the coast of Canada caused significant concerns for its government. The Canadian government considered the possibility that the Axis might use Saint Pierre and Miquelon as a base of operations. The colony's proximity to Canada and Newfoundland could offer German submariners an excellent position to re-supply and coordinate attacks upon Allied convoys. This was helped by the fact that the islands were able to communicate to the French mainland by means of wireless communication and transatlantic cables. It was feared that the islands' authorities could transmit vital information to Vichy France and inform German submarine crews about meteorological conditions, the movements of Allied warships and the progression of convoys. There was also concern that local fishery products could be sent to Germany through mainland France and, in turn, contribute to the Axis war effort.

Even before the armistice, the government of Newfoundland called for an invasion of Saint Pierre and Miquelon. After consultations with the United Kingdom, it was recommended that Newfoundland should discuss the issue with the Canadian government. However, an invasion did not come to fruition as Canada's War Cabinet refused to initiate an action for fear of offending the American State Department. Concerns grew throughout 1941 as the Battle of the Atlantic reached Canadian waters. The Canada–United States Permanent Joint Board on Defence had unanimously agreed on 10 November 1941 that the existence of an uncontrolled and high-powered wireless transmitting station on the islands constituted a potential danger to the interests of Canada and the United States. However, the United States vigorously opposed any forceful attempt to take control of the islands.

During this time, Charles de Gaulle sent Admiral Muselier to investigate the possibility of invading the islands. Despite continued objections from the United States, de Gaulle ordered the capture of Saint Pierre and Miquelon.

Capture
Acting against the orders of the Canadian rear Admiral Leonard W. Murray, at 3am on 24 December 1941, the flotilla arrived off the port of Saint-Pierre and disembarked 230 armed sailors. After meeting no resistance, Free French forces captured the islands in only 20 minutes.

Aftermath
After the arrest of Governor de Bournat, the Free French authorities organized a plebiscite on 25 December 1941. Males of 18 years and over were given a choice of "rallying to Free France or collaborating with Axis powers". Close to 98 per cent of the male population voted in favor of Free French administration. News of the capture reached the United States with Secretary of State Cordell Hull calling the capture a violation of the Monroe Doctrine. He compared the capture of the islands by the Free French to Nazi and Japanese aggression.

References

Source
 

History of Saint Pierre and Miquelon
Free French Naval Forces
Battles and operations of World War II involving France
1941 in the French colonial empire
December 1941 events
Canada–France relations
France–United States relations
Bilateral relations of the Dominion of Newfoundland
Military battles of Vichy France